Janet Pressley is an American singer-songwriter from Cincinnati, Ohio, who founded the Blue Jordan Coffeehouse which later became Blue Jordan Records. She has released two full-length records on the label; Late Last Night and A Deeper State Of Blue. She also released a special EP entitled Songs To Sing in a Cathedral at Advent in 2005. Dirty Linen described her 1996 debut, Late Last Night as "a refreshing collection of songs in the folk-pop rock vein, melodic and catchy, with nice lyrical depth."

References

External links
 Official website
 "Rhythm in the City: Janet Pressley inspired by son", by Sarah Knott, Cincinnati.com, June 8, 2001

American women singer-songwriters
Living people
Singer-songwriters from Ohio
Musicians from Cincinnati
Year of birth missing (living people)
21st-century American women